Bel-Ridge is a suburban city in northern St. Louis County, Missouri, United States. The population was 2,737 at the 2010 census. Bel-Ridge is part of the Normandy Schools Collaborative. Bel-Ridge became a city in 2015 by a vote of the voters.

Geography
Bel-Ridge is located at  (38.714868, -90.328081).

Demographics

2010 census
As of the census of 2010, there were 2,737 people, 1,087 households, and 690 families living in the village. The racial makeup of the village was 14.2% White, 83.1% African American, 0.3% Native American, 0.4% Asian, 0.4% from other races, and 1.6% from two or more races. Hispanic or Latino of any race were 1.3% of the population.

There were 1,087 households, of which 39.9% had children under the age of 18 living with them, 18.1% were married couples living together, 38.7% had a female householder with no husband present, 6.6% had a male householder with no wife present, and 36.5% were non-families. 30.5% of all households were made up of individuals, and 5.4% had someone living alone who was 65 years of age or older. The average household size was 2.52 and the average family size was 3.12.

The median age in the village was 28.7 years. 29.5% of residents were under the age of 18; 14.9% were between the ages of 18 and 24; 23.7% were from 25 to 44; 23.9% were from 45 to 64; and 8.1% were 65 years of age or older. The gender makeup of the village was 45.0% male and 55.0% female.

2000 census
As of the census of 2000, there were 3,082 people, 1,180 households, and 748 families living in the village. The racial makeup of the village was 17.55% White, 79.66% African American, 0.23% Native American, 0.39% Asian, 0.03% Pacific Islander, 0.13% from other races, and 2.01% from two or more races. Hispanic or Latino of any race were 1.17% of the population.

There were 1,180 households, out of which 36.9% had children under the age of 18 living with them, 23.7% were married couples living together, 34.4% had a female householder with no husband present, and 36.6% were non-families. 30.0% of all households were made up of individuals, and 5.1% had someone living alone who was 65 years of age or older. The average household size was 2.60 and the average family size was 3.26.

In the village, the population was spread out, with 32.5% under the age of 18, 12.3% from 18 to 24, 29.4% from 25 to 44, 18.8% from 45 to 64, and 7.0% who were 65 years of age or older. The median age was 28 years. For every 100 females, there were 85.8 males. For every 100 females age 18 and over, there were 74.0 males.

The median income for a household in the village was $47,500, and the median income for a family was $53,550. Males had a median income of $49,844 versus $49,576 for females. The per capita income for the village was $39,073. About 13.5% of families and 9.7% of the population were below the poverty line, including 10.1% of those under age 18 and 7.8% of those age 65 or over.

Police Department

The Bel-Ridge Police Department (BRPD) is a police force responsible for law enforcement in the village. The BRPD operates out of a relatively new municipal building, which was finished in 2006. The BRPD is staffed by trained and certified police officers that meet the Missouri P.O.S.T standards. Bel-Ridge was once known as a heavy ticket writing town within St. Louis County, Mo. but have changed from writing a lot of tickets to concentrating on reducing crime within the city limits.

References

Villages in St. Louis County, Missouri
Villages in Missouri